Sajeeb Ahmed Wazed (born 27 July 1971), also known as Sajeeb Wazed Joy, is a Bangladeshi businessman and politician. He is a member of the Awami League and serves as Advisor to the Government of Bangladesh on Information and Communication Technology.

Early life and education
Wazed was born in Dhaka during the Bangladesh Liberation War on 27 July 1971. His parents were nuclear scientist Dr. M. A. Wazed Miah and Sheikh Hasina Wazed. In August 1975, his grandparents and uncles were assassinated during a military coup in Bangladesh; he and his mother, father and aunt survived as they were visiting West Germany. The family was barred by the military regime from entering the country until 1981. After returning to Bangladesh in 1981, his mother assumed the presidency of the Awami League and spearheaded the campaign for the restoration of democracy, along with her arch-rival Khaleda Zia. Wazed attended boarding school in India, including St. Joseph's College in Nainital and Kodaikanal International School in Palani Hills, Tamil Nadu. He studied computer science at the University of Bangalore; then transferred to The University of Texas at Arlington in the United States, where he graduated with a BSc in computer engineering. Subsequently, Wazed attended Harvard Kennedy School at Harvard University, where he completed his Masters in Public Administration.

Wazed was settled in the United States for over two decades. He married Kristine Ann Overmire on 26 October 2002. They have a daughter named Sophia. Their house is located in Falls Church, Virginia. Since 2009, Wazed has divided his time between Bangladesh and the United States.

Career
He is the President of the US-based firm Wazed Consulting Inc. Wazed is regarded as the mastermind of the Digital Bangladesh initiative and promoting the Vision 2021 manifesto of the Awami League. Wazed was listed by the World Economic Forum as one of its Young Global Leaders. Wazed is also a lobbyist and columnist on behalf of the Bangladeshi government.

Wazed has pledged to transform Bangladesh's IT industry into the country's largest export sector, but critics say he has achieved little towards that end. Wazed has accused the Editor of The Daily Star, the country's largest circulated English daily, of sedition; and a pro-opposition journalist of attempted murder. Wazed has also had conflicts with Nobel laureate Muhammad Yunus and refused to publicly denounce Islamic extremists for the murder of Bangladeshi atheists, in order to avoid alienating the country's conservative clergy, despite professing himself as a secularist.

Leadership
In 2007 and 2008, the country underwent another black chapter with an unelected caretaker government usurping power with the backing of the then military establishment. The notorious 'Minus Two' formula was put in place not only to rid the former Prime Minister Khaleda Zia, but also Sajeeb Wazed's mother, the then Leader of the Opposition Sheikh Hasina. After Sheikh Hasina was arrested on non-existent charges which was subsequently found to be unsubstantiated, Sajeeb Wazed took charge of bringing the world's attention not only to the plight of his mother Sheikh Hasina, but also the restoration of democracy in his motherland by launching several campaigns in United States and Europe.

His efforts brought fruition, and the military backed extra constitutional government was compelled to release Sheikh Hasina from prison, following which she has led two consecutive governments having won the national elections in 2008 and 2014 respectively.

His formal involvement in the party made its way on 25 February 2010 as he became a primary member of the Rangpur (the ancestral home district of his late father) district unit of Awami League. In addition, he joined as a voluntary and unpaid advisor to the Prime Minister Sheikh Hasina, looking after the country's ICT present and future, a role which he continues till date. Using his mother's position and his own personal reputation among party leaders, he could easily have opted for a top position in the party. However, his humility, willing to learn from the bottom and leadership traits did not allow him to do that.

Public life
Wazed first appeared on the Bangladeshi political scene in 2004, when he made a widely publicized visit to Bangladesh. On 25 February 2009, Wazed officially joined the Awami League as a primary member of the Rangpur district unit of the party. Rangpur is the ancestral home district of his father Wazed Miah and his potential parliamentary constituency.

After the Awami League returned to power in 2009 with Sheikh Hasina as Prime Minister for a second time, he made his first public statements after the BDR Mutiny, praising his mother's handling of the crisis. "This is probably the biggest incident Bangladesh has had since 1975 and our government and the prime minister has handled this compassionately, pragmatically but decisively to bring the situation under control" he said in an interview to the BBC.

Wazed has been active in promoting the Digital Bangladesh scheme of the Government of Bangladesh.

Business
According to Fairfax County public records, Wazed is the president of Wazed Consulting Inc.

Awards
 ICT for Development Award, (2016) 
 Young Global Leader, (2007)

Controversies

Corruption allegations
In April 2016, an exclusive write-up by David Bergman in the Indian website The Wire revealed that a "Suspicious Activity Report" (SAR) covering a transaction of US$300 million recorded in a memo of the United States Federal Bureau of Investigation (FBI) was linked to Wazed. But the court documents did not provide any further information about the reference to ‘US$300 million’.

Muhammad Yunus
In 2011, Wazed talk about Nobel laureate Muhammad Yunus for his leadership of Grameen Bank, claiming high levels of "fraud and impropriety" in the use of Norwegian government funds at the Nobel Peace Prize-winning organization. He claims, The government of Norway raised this as a major concern and as a compromise US$30 million was returned. The remaining approximately US$70 million was never returned. All correspondence in this regard was from Yunus himself. A spokesman for the foreign ministry in Oslo said about this issue, it was agreed in 1998 that the bank should return money wrongly transferred from the Grameen Bank to Grameen Kalyan - another part of more than 30 companies headed by Muhammad Yunus that make up the Grameen group of companies. The government of Norway had been thoroughly investigated and that it considered it to be closed.

Comments on attacks on atheists
In 2015, Wazed defended the Awami League government's refusal to publicly condemn the murder of bloggers and publishers by Islamic extremists. He opined that the government was walking a fine line to avoid alienating the country's deeply conservative clergy. His comments were described by Nick Cohen in The Guardian as "pathetic"; while Trisha Ahmed, the stepdaughter of slain Avijit Roy, responded that "Bangladesh is powerless; it's corrupt, there is no law and order, and I highly doubt that any justice will come to the murderers."

Conflict with editors
In 2016, Wazed accused Mahfuz Anam, editor and publisher of The Daily Star, of treason and demanded his imprisonment for publishing reports in 2007 on the basis of intelligence sources, accusing his mother Sheikh Hasina of corruption. The BBC has reported that the Bangladeshi government has been seeking to curtail the finances of the influential newspaper. later on Mahfuz Anam has admitted to his 'biggest mistake' in journalism, saying it was wrong of him to run corruption stories against Sheikh Hasina during the 2007-8 military-controlled caretaker regime.

Spreading misinformation
Three United Nations rapporteurs in a joint letter on December 22, 2023, accused Sajeeb Wazed of sharing misinformation against them while they pointed out gross human rights abuse in Bangladesh under the Sheikh Hasina regime. The letter, signed by Aua Baldé, the Chair-Rapporteur of the Working Group on Enforced or Involuntary Disappearances; Clement Nyaletsossi Voule, the Special Rapporteur on the rights to freedom of peaceful assembly and of association; and Mary Lawlor Special Rapporteur on the situation of human rights defenders, read: 
"By bringing into question the authenticity of the submitted claims about enforced disappearances, the media has reportedly accused Odhikar of wrongly influencing the WGEID’s reports and action [...] the Prime Minister Sheikh Hasina’s son Sajeeb Ahmed Wazed, Advisor to the Prime Minister on Information and Communication Technology, has used his verified Facebook account to challenge the credibility and integrity of the WGEID."

Previously, in June 2022, the Agence France-Presse Fact Check team, found him sharing misinformation on President Ziaur Rahman by misquoting a former president's book.

See also
 Tarique Rahman
 Suchinta Foundation

References

1971 births
Living people
Awami League politicians
Bangladeshi emigrants to the United States
Harvard Kennedy School alumni
Kodaikanal International School alumni
Politicians from Falls Church, Virginia
Sheikh Mujibur Rahman family
University of Texas at Arlington alumni